Ken or Kenneth Parker may refer to:
Ken Parker (musician) (born c. 1948), Jamaican musician
Ken Parker (guitar maker), luthier and founder of Parker Guitars
Ken Parker (comics), Italian comic book character
Kenneth Parker (judge), English judge
Kenneth Parker (cricketer) (born 1945), New Zealand cricketer
Kenneth L. Parker, American lawyer
Kenneth Parker (1959–1976), victim of serial killer John Wayne Gacy

See also
Kenny Parker, American football defensive back